From scratch may refer to:

Broadcast works 
 From Scratch (radio), National Public Radio series about "the entrepreneurial life"
 From Scratch (TV series), a Netflix original series
 "From Scratch", the premiere episode of Curious George, an American children's animated series

Musical-performance acts 
 From Scratch (music group), New Zealand-based
 From Scratch, a Canadian band (among List of Montreal music groups)
 From Scratch (album) by Cyclone Static, 2019
 Scratch Messiah, participatory performances of Handel's Messiah

See also 
 Scratch (disambiguation)
 Scratch building, creation, from raw materials, of architectural scale model